Grant Craig Denyer (born 12 September 1977) is an Australian television and radio presenter and motor racing driver, who has worked for several television networks, including Seven Network and Network 10, mostly serving as a presenter.

In 2018, he won a Gold Logie Award for Most Popular Personality on Australian Television.

Television career
In 1997, Denyer began his career in the media with a position at Prime Television in Wagga Wagga as a news reporter and journalist. He moved to Sydney to work as V8 Supercar pit reporter for Network Ten, when he caught the eye of television producer Adam Boland.

Boland saw the potential in Denyer and offered him full-time position as the weather presenter on the relaunched Sunrise program from 2004 until the end of 2006. Denyer left this position in December 2006 due to wanting to spend more time with his family, though he remained as a roving reporter for the breakfast program Sunrise.

Denyer won the fourth series of Dancing with the Stars and also hosted the celebrity duet singing competition It Takes Two from 2006 to 2008. He has also presented All Time Greatest Aussie Bloopers, Guinness World Records with co-host Shelley Craft and Australia's Got Talent. He is the holder of five official Guinness World Records.

From 2006 to 2011, he was the host of Carols in the Domain in Sydney.

In 2007, his race and television career saw him both racing and being a part of the commentary team featuring Neil Crompton, Matthew White, Mark Beretta and Daniel Gibson to report on the V8 Supercar Series.

In January 2010, Denyer returned to Sunrise as weather presenter, succeeding Fifi Box who became Entertainment editor. Grant remained weather presenter until he resigned in March 2013 to spend more time with his family. He also hosted the short-lived Iron Chef Australia, in 2010.

In late 2013, Denyer hosted Slide Show. He hosted a series of Million Dollar Minute which first aired on 16 September 2013. On 29 November 2013, Denyer resigned due to 'family reasons' and he was replaced by Weekend Sunrise sports presenter Simon Reeve.

In 2014, Denyer joined Network Ten as the host of a revived version of game show Family Feud. Denyer has described himself as a "workaholic".

In 2015, Denyer co-hosted The Great Australian Spelling Bee alongside Chrissie Swan.

In 2016, he also had a guest appearance on Neighbours for Family Feud on episode 7477.

In 2018, Denyer hosted an Australian version of Game of Games.

In 2019, Denyer co-hosted Dancing with the Stars alongside Amanda Keller and hosted Celebrity Name Game.

Television

Awards

Denyer has been nominated four times for the Logie Award for Best Presenter award at the TV Week Logie Awards. He was nominated in 2007, 2008 and 2009 for his roles on It Takes Two and on Australia's Got Talent (in 2009). He was nominated again in 2015 for his role in Family Feud.

In 2006, Denyer was recognized by voters in the TV Fugly Awards as being Australia's Spunkiest Male TV Personality. Grant has been voted "sexiest presenter on TV" by a Melbourne Metro magazine poll, and he was voted the most datable male by (Australian) New Woman magazine.

In 2016, Denyer won the silver Logie award for Best Entertainment Program for Family Feud.

In 2018, Denyer was nominated for a Gold Logie for the third year in a row, which he won, as well as winning Logie Award for Most Popular Presenter.

Radio career 
In December 2017, Southern Cross Austereo announced that Denyer would be joining 2Day FM to host the Em, Grant and Ed breakfast show with comedians Em Rusciano and Ed Kavalee. Ash London joined the show in 2019 replacing Rusciano.

In August 2019, Southern Cross Austereo announced that Grant, Ed and Ash would finish on Friday 16 August due to taking a 'new direction'. Grant, Ed and Ash was replaced by a music focused show.

On 3 October 2019, it was announced that Denyer would host a new radio show with Yvie Jones in December, the Grant and Yvie Show, a Summer breakfast show that would air in Hit Network's major metro markets, except 2Day FM in Sydney.

Recording career 
In December 2018, Denyer released his debut single, "Driving Home for Christmas".

Motor racing

Denyer drove a Ford Falcon in the Fujitsu V8 Supercar series for Speed FX Racing with Michael Caruso and Daniel Elliot. He debuted with Dick Johnson Racing in 2005. In the same year he was awarded the Mike Kable Rookie of the Year prize finishing his debut season in the top 10 (10th).

In 2006, Denyer raced in the Sandown 500 and the prestigious Bathurst 1000 with DJR and with Alex Davison. Denyer and Alex came 9th overall at Bathurst.  Denyer also had success in tarmac rallying, a podium finish in 2007's Suncoast Rally in which he drove the Les Walkden-prepared Subaru Impreza WRX STi. He finished 37.8 seconds behind the Skelta G-Force of Ray Vandersee, and 3.6 seconds clear third place-getter, Matt Close, in his Porsche Turbo. Going into the final stage he trailed Close by 4.7 seconds, and moved ahead of the Porsche to take second place.

In 2002, Denyer competed in the Bathurst 24-hour Endurance Event, he drove a Nissan 200SX. In 2003 he competed in the same event, this time driving a Porsche 996 GT3 finishing second in his class, sixth overall.

Denyer won his first ever Supercars race in the Development Series at Sandown on 7 June 2008 in the second race of the weekend. More wins came and Denyer had his best season in 2009, finishing fourth in the 2009 Fujitsu V8 Supercar Series.

In early 2010 Denyer stated he would no longer be pursuing full season drives in motorsport, however in 2011 Denyer was announced as the lead driver of Shannons-Mars Racing, a V8 Supercar team formed for the purposes of a TV show, the Shannons Supercar Showdown. Denyer's Bathurst 1000 co-driver was Cameron Waters, winning the competition beating runner-up British racing driver Andrew Jordan. Waters as of 2016 became a full-time Supercars regular with ProDrive.

Denyer also competed in the Australian GT Championship with Maranello Motorsport in 2015, but switched to the McLaren 650S fielded by Tekno Autosports, sometimes in partnership with car owner and eventual 2016 Bathurst 1000 champion Jonathon Webb, in the GT series. In 2016 Denyer won the Australian Endurance Championship, an offshoot of the GT Championship, with Nathan Morcom.

Career results
Source of results is Driver Database.

Complete Bathurst 1000 results

Complete Bathurst 24 Hour results

Complete Bathurst 12 Hour results

Personal life
Denyer was born in Gosford, New South Wales. At 13, he moved to Dandenong, Victoria, spending his holidays at the Denyer family farm at Ariah Park, New South Wales.

He is married to TV producer Cheryl Rogers, who is the founder of Mummy Time. They have three daughters.

2008 injury
On 17 September 2008, Denyer injured his back whilst participating in a monster truck promotional event. He suffered a compressed fracture of the lower vertebrae, and was taken by ambulance to Wollongong Hospital.

The accident occurred while Denyer was in training for the Monster Truck Championships, driving a monster truck at Groundz Precinct, Dapto. After practising a jump over five cars in the truck, Denyer removed his foot too soon from the accelerator which caused the vehicle to land heavily; his lower vertebrae was broken in eight places. He was moved to a Sydney hospital, and his recovery took months. He was reported as saying that his injury had reduced his rather short size by 1 cm.

Denyer was then moved into intensive care, but there were no signs of any nerve damage or serious injuries, so he was back on the air to host Australia's Got Talent in 2009; however, he did not return to It Takes Two in May.

Controversies
In 2017, Denyer was banned from appearing on the radio stations Triple M and KIIS 106.5 after he used a story told by former rugby league player Matthew Johns on Triple M as his own an hour later on KISS 106.5. On the Triple M show The Grill Team, on which Denyer was a guest, Johns recounted about how he tried playing the board game Test Match with his children. Denyer later appeared on The Kyle and Jackie O Show on KIIS where he repeated the tale as his own. Johns later expressed his dismay to Kyle Sandilands on The Kyle and Jackie O Show and both hosts agreed to ban Denyer from ever appearing on either station. Later on Twitter, Denyer admitted to stealing Johns' joke and changing the punchline, with The Kyle and Jackie O Show Twitter account posting a mocking reply to him.

Denyer's 2018 Gold Logie win has proved controversial with people (including Russell Crowe) believing he only won because of Tom Gleeson's campaign. Gleeson has denied these suggestions.

References

External links

 Grant Denyer official website
 Happy Families for Grant Denyer
 It Takes Two official website
 Australia's Got Talent official website 

1977 births
Australian game show hosts
Australia's Got Talent
Dancing with the Stars (Australian TV series) winners
Motorsport announcers
People from Coffs Harbour
Racing drivers from New South Wales
Supercars Championship drivers
Weather presenters
Living people
Gold Logie winners
I'm a Celebrity...Get Me Out of Here! (Australian TV series) participants
Australian Endurance Championship drivers
Kelly Racing drivers
Dick Johnson Racing drivers
Nürburgring 24 Hours drivers
McLaren Racing drivers
Lamborghini Squadra Corse drivers